Aniuar Borisovich Geduev (born 26 January 1987) is a Russian freestyle wrestler of Circassian Kabardian ancestry.

Career
Geduev competed in the 74 kg division at the 2013 European Wrestling Championships and the 2014 European Wrestling Championships, winning gold medals in both competitions. In the gold-medal match at the 2015 European Games he defeated Soner Demirtaş of Turkey by technical fall (10–0). Geduev claimed his first world medal later that year, winning bronze at the World Wrestling Championships in 2015. In the rematch of the 2016 Russian Nationals, he beat the three-time world champion Denis Tsargush and won the Olympic Team Trials. He competed at the 2016 Olympics. After his win over Bekzod Abdurakhmonov of Uzbekistan in the opening round, he beat Jordan Burroughs of United States in the quarterfinals. He then beat Jabrayil Hasanov of Azerbaijan to claim his spot in the finals. He lost his final match to the Iranian wrestler Hassan Yazdani and was awarded the silver medal.

References

External links
 

1987 births
Living people
Circassians
Circassian people of Russia
European Games gold medalists for Russia
European Games medalists in wrestling
Russian male sport wrestlers
Sportspeople from Kabardino-Balkaria
World Wrestling Championships medalists
Wrestlers at the 2015 European Games
Wrestlers at the 2016 Summer Olympics
Olympic medalists in wrestling
Olympic wrestlers of Russia
Olympic silver medalists for Russia
Medalists at the 2016 Summer Olympics
European Wrestling Championships medalists